Murv Jacob (January 27, 1945 - February 26, 2019) was an American artist and illustrator.  He is known for his paintings illustrating the culture of the Cherokee tribe and the landscape of the southeastern United States.

Early life
Jacob was born in Glendale, Ohio. Raised in eastern Kansas, he attended San Bernardino Valley College in California.

Career
From 1965 to 1967 Jacob lived in San Francisco, where he made posters for artists such as Allen Ginsberg and the Grateful Dead.  He returned to Kansas in 1971, and in 1984 moved to Tahlequah, Oklahoma, a center for the culture of the Cherokee Nation.

Jacob created oil and acrylic paintings portraying the old and modern Cherokee dances, and the villages, animals, landscapes and perhaps best known for his illustrations of the old Cherokee animal stories especially those about Ji-sdu the rabbit and Yona the bear.

In 2011, Jacob co-wrote and illustrated the book Secret History of the Cherokees

In 2015, Jacob was in the news when a neighbors insisted that he remove a graffiti-like painting which he had commissioned on the side wall of his studio fifteen years before.

Jacob died on February 26, 2019.

Awards 
Jacob won more than 50 awards, and has twice been voted Wordcraft Circle of Native Writers' Illustrator of the Year. In 2012, he won the Wordcraft Circle Award for Secret History of the Cherokees.

Jacob and his partner Debbie Duvall, who have collaborated on a dozen books, received the “Oklahoma Book Award” in 2005 for their seven book series “The Grandmother Stories”.

Selected illustration credits 

 Rabbit and the Well
 Rabbit and the Fingerbone Necklace
 Rabbit Goes to Kansas
 Rabbit Plants the Forest
 Rabbit and the Wolves
 Rabbit Goes Duck Hunting
 Rabbit and the Bears
 The Opossum's Tale
 How Rabbit Tricked Otter and Other Cherokee Trickster Stories
 How Rabbit Lost his Tail
 How Medicine Came to the People: a Tale of the Ancient Cherokees 
 The Great Ball Game of the Birds and Animals, winner of the 2003 Oklahoma book awards
 Four Ancestors: Stories, Songs, and Poems from Native North America
 Tecumseh: Leader
 How Turtle‘s Back Was Cracked 
 Boy Who Lived with the Bears and Other Iroquois Stories
 Rabbit and the Bears 
 Dog People: Native Dog Stories 
 Turtle Meat and Other Stories 
 Circle of Thanks 
 Flying with the Eagle, Racing the Great Bear 
 The Legend of the Windigo
 The Dark Island
 The Long Way Home
 The Dark Way
 Mountain Windsong
 Cherokee Dragon
 The Way of the Priests
 War Woman
 The Peace Chief
 The War Trail North
 The Way South
 Ezekiel's Wheels
 The Education of Little Tree
 Pushing the Bear
 Designs of the Night Sky
 Mankiller: A Chief and her people
 Tribes of the Southern Woodlands

Notes

References 
 Murv Jacob and Debbie Duvall The Art of Collaboration by Jake Cornwell Oklahoma Center for Poets & Writers
 Talking Animals: An Interview with Murv Jacob, by Sean Teuton in American Indian Culture and Research Journal, Vol. 26, No. 2 2002.
 Boston Globe Horn award

External links
 Murv Jacob website
Oral History Interview with Murv Jacob

1945 births
2019 deaths
American illustrators
People from Glendale, Ohio